The 2003 Norwegian Touring Car Championship season was the 2nd of 3 seasons of the championship. It was decided over six race weekends (comprising twelve races) at three different circuits.

The championship was won by Alf-Aslak Eng with Team Eng's Auto.

Teams and Drivers

Race calendar and winners

Drivers Championship
Points were awarded to the top ten drivers in a race as follows: 20, 15, 12, 10, 8, 6, 4, 3, 2, 1.

References

Norwegian Touring Car Championship
Norwegian Touring Car Championship season
National championships in Norway
Touring car racing series